Brefonalol is a beta-adrenergic antagonist that reduces heart frequency and blood pressure and dilates blood vessels. It has been studied in around 1990, but is not known to be marketed .

References

Beta blockers
2-Quinolones
Phenylethanolamines